Live at the Inferno is a live album by the heavy metal band Raven. It was released in 1984 on Megaforce Records. The song "Live at the Inferno" first appeared on Raven's 1982 album Wiped Out. The album was intended to discourage the band's former label, Neat Records, from putting out a greatest hits compilation. It was the band's last release before signing with Atlantic Records.

According to John Gallagher the title of the bass solo, "I.G.A.R.B.O.," stands for "I've got a rampant boner on."

The album's title was borrowed from a 1970 live album of the same title by an American 60s rock band also named Raven.

Track listing
All songs by Gallagher, Gallagher and Hunter.
Defcon 4
"Intro / Live at the Inferno" – 2:22
"Take Control" – 3:10 
"Mind over Metal" – 3:35
"Crash Bang Wallop" – 3:13
"Rock until You Drop" – 4:26
"Faster than the Speed of Light" – 4:14

Defcon 3
"All for One" – 3:47
"Forbidden Planet" – 4:03 
"Star War" – 5:27
"Tyrant of the Airways / Run Silent, Run Deep" – 6:50

Defcon 2 
"Crazy World" – 4:50 
"Let It Rip" – 4:08
"I.G.A.R.B.O." – 2:04 
"Wiped Out" – 4:10 
"Firepower" – 3:40

Defcon 1
"Don't Need Your Money" – 3:30 
"Break the Chain" – 4:18
"Hell Patrol" – 7:19 
"Live at the Inferno" – 7:25

Personnel

Raven
John Gallagher - basses, lead vocals
Mark Gallagher - guitar
Rob Hunter - drums, backing vocals

Production
Alex Perialas, Peter Bombar - mobile engineers
Norman Dunn - live sound engineer, studio engineer, mixing
Jack Skinner - mastering at Sterling Sound, New York
Jon Zazula, Marsha Zazula, Tony Incigeri - executive producers

References

Raven (British band) albums
1984 live albums
Live New Wave of British Heavy Metal albums
Megaforce Records live albums